Euxoa comosa, the hairy euxoa moth, is a moth of the family Noctuidae first described by Herbert Knowles Morrison in 1876. It is found in western North America, except the Pacific coast, ranging east through the northern Great Plains, and in the Hudsonian zone to the Atlantic Ocean. It is found in every province and territory of Canada, except Nunavut.

The wingspan is about 32 mm.

Larvae have been recorded on Secale cereale.

Subspecies
Euxoa comosa altera (Manitoba, North Dakota)
Euxoa comosa annir (Colorado, North Dakota, Alberta)
Euxoa comosa lutulenta (California, Alberta, British Columbia, Oregon)
Euxoa comosa ontario (Ontario, New Brunswick)

External links

"Euxoa comosa Hairy Euxoa Moth". NatureServe Explorer. Retrieved November 10, 2020.

Euxoa
Moths of North America
Moths described in 1876